Tadjou Salou (24 December 1974 – 2 April 2007) was a Togolese footballer player who played as a defender.

Career
Born in Lomé, Salou played club football for Modèle de Lomé, OC Agaza, Club Africain, Servette, Étoile Carouge, AS Douanes and Étoile Filante.

He was a member of the Togo national team between 1992 and 2007, serving as captain. He was a squad member at the 2000 African Cup of Nations.

Later life and death
Salou died following a "long illness" in April 2007.

References

1974 births
2007 deaths
Togolese footballers
Togo international footballers
CO Modèle de Lomé players
OC Agaza players
Club Africain players
Servette FC players
Étoile Carouge FC players
AS Douanes (Togo) players
Étoile Filante du Togo players
Swiss Super League players
Association football defenders
Togolese expatriate footballers
Togolese expatriate sportspeople in Tunisia
Expatriate footballers in Tunisia
Togolese expatriate sportspeople in Switzerland
Expatriate footballers in Switzerland
21st-century Togolese people